Letis xylia is a species of moth in the family Erebidae first described by Achille Guenée in 1852. It is found in North America.

The MONA or Hodges number for Letis xylia is 8646.1.

References

Further reading

External links

 

Thermesiini
Articles created by Qbugbot
Moths described in 1852